Kirschsteiniothelia is a genus of fungi in the class Dothideomycetes. The relationship of this taxon to other taxa within the class is unknown (incertae sedis).

The genus name of Kirschsteiniothelia is in honour of Wilhelm Kirschstein (1863 - 1946), who was a German schoolteacher and mycologist.

The genus was circumscribed by David Leslie Hawksworth in Bot. J. Linn. Soc. vol.91 on page 182 in 1985.

Species
Kirschsteiniothelia abietina
Kirschsteiniothelia acerina
Kirschsteiniothelia aethiops
Kirschsteiniothelia atkinsonii
Kirschsteiniothelia dolioloides
Kirschsteiniothelia elaterascus
Kirschsteiniothelia maritima
Kirschsteiniothelia phileura
Kirschsteiniothelia populi
Kirschsteiniothelia proteae
Kirschsteiniothelia recessa
Kirschsteiniothelia reticulata
Kirschsteiniothelia smilacis
Kirschsteiniothelia striatispora
Kirschsteiniothelia thujina
Kirschsteiniothelia umbrinoidea
Kirschsteiniothelia xera

See also
 List of Dothideomycetes genera incertae sedis

References

Dothideomycetes enigmatic taxa
Dothideomycetes genera
Taxa named by David Leslie Hawksworth